NJIT Steel Bridge Team is a team within the New Jersey Institute of Technology's ASCE chapter). It consists of undergraduate students who are attending at NJIT, majoring in civil engineering, and also members of ASCE. Every year, the team competes against other schools in a steel bridge competition.

Every year, the team has a few fund raising events, which are very crucial for the competition because the team needs to have proper finance in order to order parts and fabricate them. Besides fund raising, sponsors from other corporates and companies are very important too.

A lot of time the team members get together and have outside activities such as hiking, paint ball, go cart, or whatever anyone wants to do. The team also does many productive activities such as visiting high schools and talking about civil engineering and the steel bridge competition. 

There is at least a meeting every week talking about the process of the team and keeping members informed. Meetings are always held during common hours. Sometimes pizzas and drinks are served.

The competition 
The objective of the competition is to design a light bridge yet strong and economically and assembly it fast with as few team members as possible. 

The competition has 3 processes: Design & testing, which students do that themselves using programs, knowledges they learned from classes, and sometimes help from professors and alumni; Fabrication, which is when students grind, weld, and fit the parts together; and finally Assembly, which is when students put the parts together to achieve the designed bridge. 

There are 6 categories in scoring: Display (how the bridge look), construction speed (time management), construction economy (low cost to build), lightness, stiffness (aggregate deflection), and structural efficiency (a formula used to calculate this based on weight and deflection).

The competition occurs every year. It is hosted at different places every time. This year, 2008, the regional competition will be hosted at Polytechnic Institute of NYU, New York City, on Saturday April 4, 2009; and the national competition will be hosted at University of Nevada, Las Vegas on May 22 and May 23. 

If there are 1-4 teams competing in the region, the best team will proceed to the national competition

If there are 5-10 teams competing in the region, the 2 best teams will proceed to the national competition

If there are more than 10 teams competing in the region, the 3 best teams will proceed to the national competition

The price for winning the national competition is $2,500

Awards 
2012 National Competition at Clemson, SC
15th Place Overall - Highest in History
9th Place in Construction Speed

2012 Regional Competition
1st Place Overall
1st Place Economy
1st Place Stiffness
1st Place Build Time

2010 National Competition (at Purdue University)
 Nineteenth Place Overall

2010 Regional Competition (Regional competition score-sheet)
 First Place Overall (first place all categories including Construction speed, Lightness, Stiffness, Construction economy, Structural efficiency and Display)

2009 National Competition (at University of Nevada, Las Vegas)
 Twenty-Fourth Place Overall

2009 Regional Competition (Regional competition score-sheet)
First Place Overall
First Place Efficieny
First Place Stiffness

2008 National Competition (at University of Florida)
 Nineteenth Place Overall ($3.390 Million)
 Twenty-fourth Place Efficiency ($1.327 Million)
 Sixteenth Place Economy ($2.062 Million)
 Twenty-sixth Place Stiffness (0.75” Aggregate Deflection)
 Twenty-second Place Aesthetics
 Twenty-fifth Place Lightness (267.6 lbs)
 Nineteenth Place Construction Speed (7.85 mins including Penalties)
 In a field of 42 Teams

2008 Regional Competition
 First Place Overall
 Second Place Efficiency
 First Place Economy
 Second Place Lightness
 First Place Construction Speed
 Second Place Stiffness

2007 National Competition
2007 Regional Competition
 First Place Overall
 First Place Efficiency
 First Place Economy
 First Place Lightness
 First Place Construction Speed

2006 National Competition

2006 Regional Competition

2005 National Competition

2005 Regional Competition

· Second Place Overall

· First Place Efficiency

· First Place Aesthetics

· First Place Stiffness

2004 National Competition

2004 Regional Competition

2003 National Competition

2003 Regional Competition

· First Place Overall

· First Place Lightness

· First Place Efficiency

· First Place Economy

· First Place Stiffness

· First Place Construction Speed

2002 National Competition

2002 Regional Competition

· First Place Overall

· First Place Efficiency

· First Place Stiffness

2001 National Competition

2001 Regional Competition

· Second Place Overall

· First Place Efficiency

· First Place Aesthetics

Corporate Partners 
 SCHIAVONE - Constructors & Engineers
 Acrow Bridges

Corporate Sponsors 
 Weiss-aug
 EECRUZ
 Hardesty & Hanover
 Lapatka Associates, Inc.
 Bloomfield Mason Supply
 Chalet Construction Corp
 S.Seltzer Construction Corp.

Previous Sponsors 
 Acrow Bridges
 EECRUZ
 Local No. 11
 Parsons Brinckerhoff
 ASCE North Jersey Branch
 CIAP of NJ
 The Conti Group
 Mueser Rutledge Consulting Engineers
 Braemar Homes, L.L.C.
 Conklin Associates
 Greenberg Farrow
 Moretrench
 Northeast Remsco Construction
 Phoenix Site Management
 Tishman
 Kelly Engineering
 S.Seltzer Construction Corp.
 Suburban Consulting Engineers INC.

External links
 'NJIT Steel Bridge Team'
 'ASCE/AISC Student Steel Bridge Competition 2011 Competition Guide'

References

Engineering organizations